Kulwant Singh  is a businessman and politician who is currently a Member of Legislative Assembly from SAS Nagar and is the first Mayor of Mohali (Punjab). He is a member of the Aam Aadmi Party.

Early life
He was born into a Ramdasia Sikh family of an army man at Samana Kalan, Rupnagar, Punjab.

He left his village and went to Zirakpur and spent three years weighing trucks and other heavy vehicles. He also rode horse carts through the streets to sell the stock of wheat straw.

Business
Kulwant Singh is a real estate businessman and philanthropist. He is the Managing Director of Janta Land Promoters Ltd. and have turnover of Rs.1500 crore. He also has two commercial buildings which include two shop-cum-offices in Sector 82, Mohali.

He owns plots, residential areas and other properties in various places of Punjab and Himachal Pradesh.

Political career
Kulwant Singh represented the ward number 21 as Senior Vice-President of Mohali Municipal Council elections in 1995 for the first time. He was also President of Mohali Municipal Council from 2000 to 2005. In 2015, he became first mayor of Mohali after declaration of the council being upgraded as the municipal corporation. He was a candidate for the Fatehgarh Sahib Constituency on the SAD-BJP ticket in 2014 Lok Sabha Elections. Kulwant was one of the richest candidates from Punjab.

Member of Legislative Assembly
He represents the Sahibzada Ajit Singh Nagar Assembly constituency as MLA in Punjab Assembly. The Aam Aadmi Party gained a strong 79% majority in the sixteenth Punjab Legislative Assembly by winning 92 out of 117 seats in the 2022 Punjab Legislative Assembly election. MP Bhagwant Mann was sworn in as Chief Minister on 16 March 2022.

Committee assignments of Punjab Legislative Assembly 
Member (2022–23) Committee on Local Bodies
Member (2022–23) Committee on Subordinate Legislation 
Member (2022–23) Committee on Agriculture and its allied activities

Electoral performance

References

External links

Municipal Corporation SAS Nagar

1961 births
Living people
National Democratic Alliance candidates in the 2014 Indian general election
People from Rupnagar district
Mayors of places in Punjab, India
Former members of Shiromani Akali Dal
People from Mohali
Punjab, India MLAs 2022–2027
Aam Aadmi Party politicians from Punjab, India